Computer display standards are a combination of aspect ratio, display size, display resolution, color depth, and refresh rate. They are associated with specific expansion cards, video connectors and monitors.

History

Various computer display standards or display modes have been used in the history of the personal computer. They are often a combination of aspect ratio (specified as width-to-height ratio), display resolution (specified as the width and height in pixels), color depth (measured in bits per pixel), and refresh rate (expressed in hertz). Associated with the screen resolution and refresh rate is a display adapter. Earlier display adapters were simple frame-buffers, but later display standards also specified a more extensive set of display functions and software controlled interface.

Beyond display modes, the VESA industry organization has defined several standards related to power management and device identification, while ergonomics standards are set by the TCO.

Standards
A number of common resolutions have been used with computers descended from the original IBM PC. Some of these are now supported by other families of personal computers. These are de facto standards, usually originated by one manufacturer and reverse-engineered by others, though the VESA group has co-ordinated the efforts of several leading video display adapter manufacturers. Video standards associated with IBM-PC-descended personal computers are shown in the diagram and table below, alongside those of early Macintosh and other makes for comparison. (From the early 1990s onwards, most manufacturers moved over to PC display standards thanks to widely available and affordable hardware).

Display resolution prefixes
Although the common standard prefixes super and ultra do not indicate specific modifiers to base standard resolutions, several others do:
Quarter (Q or q)
A quarter of the base resolution. E.g. QVGA, a term for a 320×240 resolution, half the width and height of VGA, hence the quarter total resolution. The "Q" prefix usually indicates "Quad" (4 times as many, not 1/4 times as many) in higher resolutions, and sometimes "q" is used instead of "Q" to specify quarter (by analogy with SI prefixes m/M), but this usage is not consistent.
Wide (W)
The base resolution increased by increasing the width and keeping the height constant, for square or near-square pixels on a widescreen display, usually with an aspect ratio of either 16:9 (adding an extra 1/3rd width vs a standard 4:3 display) or 16:10 (adding an extra 1/5th). However, it is sometimes used to denote a resolution that would have roughly the same total pixel count as this, but in a different aspect and sharing neither the horizontal OR vertical resolution—typically for a 16:10 resolution which is narrower but taller than the 16:9 option, and therefore larger in both dimensions than the base standard (e.g., compare 1366×768 and 1280×800, both commonly labelled as "WXGA", vs the base 1024×768 "XGA").
Quad(ruple) (Q)
Four times as many pixels compared to the base resolution, i.e. twice the horizontal and vertical resolution respectively.
Hex(adecatuple) (H)
Sixteen times as many pixels compared to the base resolution, i.e. four times the horizontal and vertical resolutions respectively.
Super (S), eXtended (X), Plus (+) and/or Ultra (U)
Vaguer terms denoting successive incremental steps up the resolution ladder from some comparative, more established base, usually somewhat less severe a jump than quartering or Quadrupling—typically less than doubling, and sometimes not even as much of a change as making a "wide" version; for example SVGA (800×600 vs 640×480), SXGA (1280×1024 vs 1024×768), SXGA+ (1400×1050 vs 1280×1024) and UXGA (1600×1200 vs 1024×768 - or more fittingly, vs the 1280×1024 of SXGA, the conceptual "next step down" at the time of UXGA's inception, or the 1400×1050 of SXGA+). Given the use of "X" in "XGA", it is not often used as an additional modifier (e.g. there is no such thing as XVGA except as an alternative designation for SXGA) unless its meaning would be unambiguous.

These prefixes are also often combined, as in WQXGA or WHUXGA, with levels of stacking not hindered by the same consideration towards readability as the decline of the added "X" - especially as there is not even a defined hierarchy or value for S/X/U/+ modifiers.

See also
 Display resolution; this also lists the display resolutions of standard and HD televisions, which are sometimes used as computer monitors.
 Graphics display resolution
 List of common resolutions
 List of video connectors

References

External links 
 Calculate and compare display sizes, resolutions, and source material
 Display the resolution and color bit depth of your current monitor
 Calculate screen dimensions according to format and diagonal
 Standard resolutions used for computer graphics equipment, TV and video applications and mobile devices.
 Large image of graphic card history tree

 
Digital imaging
Graphics standards
VESA